Brown Cottage was the first building of the educational institution in Hampton, Virginia now known as Hampton University.  Mary S. Peake used the cottage to teach both children and adult freedmen.

References

See also
Mary S. Peake
Hampton University''

Buildings and structures in Hampton, Virginia
Hampton University
1861 establishments in Virginia